Dushanbekovo (Düşämbikä) is a rural locality (a selo) and the administrative centre of Dushanbekovsky Selsoviet, Kiginsky District, Bashkortostan, Russia. The population was 622 as of 2010. There are 6 streets.

Geography 
Dushanbekovo is located 11 km northwest of Verkhniye Kigi (the district's administrative centre) by road. Tukayevo is the nearest rural locality.

References 

Rural localities in Kiginsky District